Hrant Alianak (born 1950), also billed as Harant Alianak or Grant Aljanak, is an Armenian-Canadian actor and playwright.

Career
In 1988, he was nominated for the Genie Award "Best Performance by an Actor in a Supporting Role" for the 1987 film Family Viewing. He played Pete in the 1995 Adam Sandler movie Billy Madison. He portrayed Dr. Mendez in the 2009 Canadian horror film Pontypool. He also played Dr. Marek in "Stay Out of the Basement", a 1996 episode of the TV series Goosebumps.

Alianak's plays include Lucky Strike, The Walls of Africa, and The Blues. Alianak made his debut as a writer in 1972 at Theatre Passe Muraille, with Tantrums.

The Walls of Africa was the 2001 winner of three Dora Awards, including Best New Play, and was published by Scirocco Drama in 2002. Scirocco has also published The Blues (2003).

In 2010, Alianak portrayed Principal Hicks in the movie My Babysitter's a Vampire. In 2011, he reprised the role in the TV series based on  the movie. His other television credits include being a member of the repertory cast of the A&E TV series A Nero Wolfe Mystery (2002).

Filmography

Film

Television

References

External links 
 Official site

1950 births
Canadian people of Armenian descent
Canadian male television actors
Canadian male film actors
Canadian male stage actors
Canadian male voice actors
20th-century Canadian dramatists and playwrights
21st-century Canadian dramatists and playwrights
Living people
20th-century Canadian male actors
21st-century Canadian male actors
Canadian male dramatists and playwrights
20th-century Canadian male writers
21st-century Canadian male writers